Yongxing is a town of Li County, Gansu, China. The population is 24,000. It is located about 25 km away from the county seat. The town's government seat is Yongxing village. The town was established in 1952.

References 

Township-level divisions of Gansu
Longnan